The Spain national junior handball team is the national under–20 handball team of Spain. Controlled by the Royal Spanish Handball Federation, it represents Spain in international matches.

References

Men's national junior handball teams
Men
Handball